Looe West, Lansallos and Lanteglos was an electoral division of Cornwall in the United Kingdom which returned one member to sit on Cornwall Council between 2013 and 2021. It was abolished at the 2021 local elections, being succeeded by Looe West, Pelynt, Lansallos and Lanteglos

Councillors

Extent
Looe West, Lansallos and Lanteglos represented the town of West Looe, the villages of Polruan, Bodinnick, Lansallos, Polperro, Porthallow and Lanteglos Highway, and the hamlets of Mixtow, Crumplehorn, Carey Park, Talland and Trenewan. The division covered 3,660 hectares in total.

Election results

2017 election

2013 election

References

Electoral divisions of Cornwall Council
Looe